Lucy Brown (born 11 January 1993) is a former professional tennis player from the United Kingdom. On 9 July 2012, she reached her highest WTA singles ranking of 540.

Tennis career

Brown's parents played tennis socially, and she began playing seriously when she was nine. She played in Oxfordshire, and trained at the LTA academy in Loughborough and then the Bisham Abbey High Performance Centre. She then trained in Spain and then at the National Tennis Centre in Roehampton, but her tennis training was\ a source of financial stress.

During her professional career, she won 6 ITF Pro Circuit Doubles Titles. She played doubles at Wimbledon in 2010 with her friend Laura Robson.

Injuries ended her professional career.

Subsequent career

Brown is now the head coach at Cothill House, a boys' boarding school in Oxfordshire.

References

1993 births
Living people
British female tennis players